Charles LeMaire (April 22, 1897 – June 8, 1985) was an American costume designer. He
was born in Chicago.

LeMaire's early career was as a vaudeville performer, but he became a costume designer for such Broadway productions as Ziegfeld Follies and The Five O'Clock Girl. By 1925 he turned to the movies. LeMaire was instrumental in persuading the Academy of Motion Picture Arts and Sciences to institute a costume design Oscar. In a career spanning 37 years and nearly 300 films, he earned a total of three Academy Awards and an additional 13 nominations.

LeMaire died of heart failure in 1985.

Filmography 
 Take a Chance (1933)
 The Razor's Edge (1946)
 Gentleman's Agreement (1947)
 A Letter to Three Wives (1949)
 The Gunfighter (1950)
 All About Eve (1950)
 David and Bathsheba (1951)
 The Day the Earth Stood Still (1951)
 The Robe (1953)
 Désirée (1954) 
 Three Coins in the Fountain (1954)
 Love is a Many-Splendored Thing (1955)
 Carousel (1956)
 Walk on the Wild Side (1962)

 Oscar win
 Oscar nomination

External links
 
 AllMovieGuide
 Charles Le Maire costume designs, 1921 and undated, held by the Billy Rose Theatre Division, New York Public Library for the Performing Arts
 Charles Le Maire costume designs for the Greenwich Village follies, 1925 and 1926., held by the Billy Rose Theatre Division, New York Public Library for the Performing Arts

American costume designers
California people in fashion
1897 births
1985 deaths
20th Century Studios people
Best Costume Design Academy Award winners
Artists from Chicago
Vaudeville performers